This is a partial list of notable Chechen people.

Military personnel

13th–19th century 

Khasi I, prince of Durdzuketi and king Alania, participant in the Mongol invasions of Durdzuketi
Khour I, son of the previous, self proclaimed king of Alania and Durdzuketi, leader of the Insurgency in Durdzuketi
Botur, participant in the Mongol invasions of Durdzuketi on the side of the Mongols, servant in the Mongol army, king of Boturcha
Ors Ela, participant in the Mongol invasions of Durdzuketi, ruler of the pro-Mongol Durdzuketi
Chakhig, son of Khour I, leader of the Dedyakov rebellion
Khour II, 14th century Chechen prince that ruled the Princedom of Simsim
Surakat, 14th-15th century Chechen prince that ruled the Princedom of Simsim and the Avar Khanate, brother of Khour II, defended Simsim against Timurid Empire

Aldaman Gheza, Elected leader of Chechnya in the 17th century, protected the Chechen borders against several foreign invasions
Sheikh Mansur, led the resistance against Catherine the Great's imperialist expansion into the Caucasus during the late 18th century
Beibulat Taimiev, Chechen military leader and diplomat 
Isa Gendargeno, Chechen military leader during the Russo-Caucasian War
Gubash of Gukhoy, Chechen elder that was anti Caucasian Imamate
Baysangur of Benoa, Chechen governor and military leader
Uma Duyev — Chechen military leader during the Russo-Caucasian War. leader in the uprisings in Chechnya in 1860–1861 and 1877
Alexander Chechenskiy, Russian major general and participant in the Napoleonic wars
Talkhig of Shali, governor of the province of Shali in the Caucasian Imamate
Shuaib-Mulla of Tsentara, commander in the Caucasian War
Zelimkhan, Legendary Chechen folk hero

World War II 

Kanti Abdurakhmanov, Red army master sergeant, Hero of the Russian Federation
 Dasha Akayev, commander of the 35th Assault Aviation Regiment; also was the first Chechen pilot
 Mahmud Amayev, Soviet junior sergeant and sniper
 Irbaykhan Baybulatov, Red Army battalion commander, Hero of the Soviet Union
 Khansultan Dachiev, Red army Junior lieutenant and Hero of the Soviet Union
 Duda Enginoev, full bearer of the Order of Glory
Abukhadzhi Idrisov, Red army machine gunner and sniper, Hero of the Soviet Union
Khasan Israilov, leader of the 1940–1944 uprising against Soviet rule
Khavazi Muhamed-Mirzaev, Red army senior sergeant and Hero of the Soviet Union
 Khanpasha Nuradilov, highest scoring machine gunner of the Red Army, Hero of the Soviet Union
Lyalya Nasukhanova, the first Chechen woman pilot and the first Soviet woman to command a fighter jet echelon
Mairbek Sheripov, prominent leader in the 1940–1944 insurgency against Soviet rule
Movldi Umarov, Red army lieutenant and Hero of the Russian Federation
Movlid Visaitov, commander of 255th Chechen-Ingush Cavalry Regiment, and the first one to shake hands with Americans on Elbe river; posthumous Hero of the Soviet Union

Chechen-Russian war period and after 

Arbi Barayev, nicknamed "The Terminator", founder and first leader of the Special Purpose Islamic Regiment
 Movsar Barayev, militia leader during the Second Chechen War, who led seizure of Moscow theater that led to deaths of 170 people
 Shamil Basayev, militant Islamist and participant of the Chechen resistance movement
 Dzhokhar Dudayev, Soviet Air Force general and Chechen leader, first President of the Chechen Republic of Ichkeria
 Ruslan Gelayev, commander in the Chechen separatist movement
 Aslan Maskhadov, leader of the Chechen separatist movement and the third President of the Chechen Republic of Ichkeria
 Abdul-Halim Salamovich Sadulayev, fourth President of the Chechen Republic of Ichkeria

Diaspora 
 Ahmad Aladdin, Jordanian Major general, two time Hero of Jordan
 Mümtaz Çeçen, Ottoman officer
 Ahmad Ramzi, general in the Jordanian Armed forces, minister of interior of Jordan, he was also a friend of the first Jordanian King
 Mahmud Shevket, Ottoman Grand vizier known for the founding of the Ottoman airforce
 Muhammed Bashir Ismail ash-Shishani, major general in the Jordanian Army, former minister of Agriculture, mayor of Amman and director of Military intelligence

Politicians

Soviet Union 

 Ruslan Khasbulatov, Speaker of the RSFSR Supreme Soviet, 1991–1993
 Doku Zavgayev, Russian ambassador to Slovenia

Russian Federation 

 Alu Alkhanov, Russian politician, former president of Russia's Chechen Republic
 Vladislav Surkov, Businessman and Politician, former advisor to the President of Russia
 Ramzan Kadyrov, Head of the Chechen Republic
 Akhmad Kadyrov, First president of the Pro-Russian Chechen republic

Chechen Republic of Ichkeria 

Ilyas Akhmadov, former foreign minister of the Chechen Republic of Ichkeria
Dzhokhar Dudayev , first president of Chechen Republic of Ichkeria
 Zelimkhan Yandarbiyev, writer and a politician, served as acting president of the breakaway Chechen Republic of Ichkeria between 1996 and 1997
 Akhmed Zakayev, leader and prime minister of the Chechen Republic of Ichkeria

Diaspora 

 Abdul Baqi Jammoh

Business 

 Ruslan Baisarov, Chechen entrepreneur and businessman
 Musa Bazhaev, president of Alliance Group
 Malik Saidulaev, businessman and politician
 Tapa Tchermoeff, politician and oil magnate
 Ziya Bazhayev, founder of Alliance group and a philanthropist
 Umar Dzhabrailov, businessman and politician

Sports

Footballers 

Zaur Sadayev, attacking Midfielder for Turkish club Ankaragücü
Dzhabrail Kadiyev, plays for FC Legion Dynamo Makhachkala
Adlan Katsayev, attacking midfielder who plays for FC SKA-Khabarovsk
Magomed Mitrishev, striker, attacking midfielder and winger for FC Akhmat Grozny
Khalid Kadyrov, left winger for the Russian Premier League team FC Akhmat Grozny
Rizvan Utsiyev, captain of FC Akhmat Grozny
Lechi Sadulayev, plays for FC Akhmat Grozny
Mohammad Omar Shishani, striker for Al-Faisaly
Murad Tagilov, plays for FC Druzhba Maykop
Sergei Tashuyev, currently a coach, he is of Chechen and Belarusian descent
Rassambek Akhmatov, Chechen football player from France

Wrestlers 

 Islambek Albiev, Russian wrestler, a gold medalist at the 2008 Summer Olympics in Greco-Roman wrestling
 Buvaisar Saitiev, Russian wrestler of Chechen heritage, he is a six-time world champion and a three-time Olympic gold medalist in freestyle wrestling
 Adam Saitiev wrestler, a gold medalist at the 2000 Summer Olympics
 Dzhamal Otarsultanov, wrestler, won the gold medal in men's freestyle 55 kg at the 2012 Summer Olympics
Anzor Boltukaev, accomplished wrestler, beat Kyle Snyder in 2016
Albert Saritov, bronze medalist of the 2016 Olympics 
Adlan Varayev, freestyle wrestler, won a silver medal at the 1988 Olympics
Rasul Dzhukayev, won a silver medal in the 66 kg. division at the 2009 FILA World Championships
Bekkhan Goygereyev, freestyle wrestler, won the gold medal at the 2013 World Wrestling Championships
Salman Hashimikov, freestyle wrestler, won two European and four World Championship gold medals in freestyle wrestling (1979, 1981, 1982, 1983)
Bekhan Tungaev, wrestler who won the European championship back in the 1970s
Elmadi Zhabrailov, won silver in freestyle wrestling at the 1992 Summer Olympics
Chingiz Labazanov, Greco-Roman wrestler and world gold medal holder
Ramazan Şahin,  a gold medalist in freestyle wrestling at the 2008 Summer Olympics
Zelimkhan Huseynov, silver medalist at the 2009 World Wrestling Championships
Lukman Zhabrailov, gold medalist at the 1994 World Wrestling Championships
Zagir Shakhiev, gold medalist at the 2021 World Wrestling Championships
Akhmed Chakaev, two time bronze medalist at the World Wrestling Championships
Alikhan Zhabrailov, bronze medalist at the 2019 World Wrestling Championships
Roland Schwarz, bronze medalist at the 2021 World Wrestling Championships

Boxers 

 Artur Beterbiev, Unified light-heavyweight boxing champion
 Umar Salamov, professional boxer who held the IBO light-heavyweight title in 2016
Zaurbek Baysangurov, professional boxer and former WBO and IBO light middleweight champion
Khuseyn Baysangurov, professional boxer who held the WBA Continental (Europe) and the IBF International light-middleweight titles from 2017 to 2018
Apti Davtaev, Professional boxer
Imam Khataev, Tokyo 2020 bronze medalist

Mixed martial artists 

Adlan Amagov, formerly competed in the UFC, where he is the first Chechen mixed martial artist to compete
Mamed Khalidov, currently competing in the KSW
Mairbek Taisumov, formerly competed in the UFC
Zubaira Tukhugov, currently competing in the UFC
Ismail Naurdiev, formerly competed in the UFC
Khamzat Chimaev, currently competing in the UFC

Weightlifters 
 Apti Aukhadov, weightlifter, 2013 World Champion and silver medalist at the 2012 Summer Olympics

Judo practitioners 

 Hüseyin Özkan,  gold medalist at the 2000 Summer Olympics
Bashir Varaev, bronze medalist at the 1988 Summer Olympics
Shamil Borchashvili, Tokyo 2020 Olympics bronze medalist
Tamerlan Bashaev, Tokyo 2020 Olympics bronze medalist
Yakub Shamilov, bronze medalist at the 2021 World Judo Championships
Salamu Mezhidov, 2007 european champion
 Islam Matsiev
Bektaş Demirel
German Abdulaev
David Margoshvili

Musicians and dancers
 

Said Dimayev, orchestral music composer
Umar Dimayev, accordionist and folk music composer 
Ali Dimayev, musician and composer
Sultan Islamov, actor and singer
Timur Mutsurayev, musician and bard
Makka Sagaipova, popular singer
Xava Tashaeva, popular singer
Makhmud Esambayev, actor and dancer, was regarded as one of the most famous dancers of the Soviet Union
Imran Usmanov, folk singer
Ramzan Paskayev, accordionist and folk musician 
Imam Alimsultanov, folk singer

Writers and poets

Writers 
 Musa Geshaev, writer
Abuzar Aydamirov, novelist and poet
Abdurakhman Avtorkhanov, Chechen historian of the communist period

Poets 

 Magomet Mamakaev, one of the founders of modern Chechen literature
 Raisa Akhmatova, poet
 Yamlikhan Khasbulatov, writer and poet. Brother of Ruslan Khasbulatov

Scientists

Historians 
Ibragim-Bek Sarakaev, writer and historian
Khozh-Akhmed Bersanov, ethnographer and author
Aslanbek Khasbulatov , historian and director at University of Grozny, brother of Ruslan Khasbulatov
Zulay Khasbulatova , ethnographer and historian, sister of Ruslan Khasbulatov 
Dalkhan Khozhaev, historian and field commander

Physicist 
Akhmed Tsebiev, Physicist and inventor

Medicine

Surgeons 
 Khassan Baiev, Chechen-American trauma surgeon

Activists and journalists 

Natalya Estemirova, human rights activist
Salavdi Gugaev, activist for the rehabilitation of Chechens from Aardakh
Oyub Titiev, human rights activist
Hadijat Gatayeva, humanitarian activist and nurse
Amina Okueva, deceased Euromaidan activist and soldier in Ukraine conflict

Journalists 
Musa Muradov, journalist
Milana Bakhaeva (pen name Terloeva), journalist and author
Adlan Khasanov, photographer and journalist

Artists and painters 
 Pyotr Zakharov-Chechenets, first professional painter of Chechen origin

References 

Lists of people by ethnicity